The Pierce Springhouse and Barn, also known as the Art Barn, is an historic barn and springhouse located in Rock Creek Park, at Tilden Street and Beach Drive, Northwest, Washington, D.C.

History

The springhouse, built in 1801, is located in the median of Tilden Street west of the barn.

Issac Peirce built the barn for his farm complex.

In 1971, the barn was used as an Art Gallery, operated by Associates of Artists Equity. David Major, a counterintelligence adviser at the Reagan White House, ran a spy tour that claimed the pigeon coop of the barn (above the art gallery) was used to spy on the nearby Hungarian and Czechoslovak embassies.

See also
 Rock Creek Park

References

Agricultural buildings and structures on the National Register of Historic Places in Washington, D.C.
Commercial buildings completed in 1801